Chatturat station is a railway station located in Ban Kok Subdistrict, Chatturat District, Chaiyaphum. The station is on the Northeastern Line, and is the main railway station for Chaiyaphum Province.

Train services 
 Express No. 69/70 Bangkok–Nong Khai–Bangkok
 Express No. 75/76 Bangkok–Nong Khai–Bangkok
 Rapid No. 133/134 Bangkok–Nong Khai–Bangkok
 Local No. 433/434 Kaeng Khoi Junction–Bua Yai Junction–Kaeng Khoi Junction
 Local No. 439/440 Kaeng Khoi Junction–Bua Yai Junction–Kaeng Khoi Junction

References 
 
 

Railway stations in Thailand